Cláudio Tavares (born 5 February 1964) is a Brazilian rower. He competed in the men's coxed pair event at the 1992 Summer Olympics.

References

External links
 

1964 births
Living people
Brazilian male rowers
Olympic rowers of Brazil
Rowers at the 1992 Summer Olympics
Place of birth missing (living people)
Pan American Games medalists in rowing
Pan American Games silver medalists for Brazil
Pan American Games bronze medalists for Brazil
Rowers at the 1987 Pan American Games
Rowers at the 1991 Pan American Games
Rowers at the 1995 Pan American Games